The list of ship decommissionings in 1944 includes a chronological list of all ships decommissioned in 1944.


References 

1944
 Ship decommissionings
Ship